Fazlur Rahman Babu (born 22 August 1960) is a Bangladeshi actor and singer. He won Bangladesh National Film Award for Best Supporting Actor 4 times for his roles in the films Shonkhonaad (2004), Meyeti Ekhon Kothay Jabe (2017),  Fagun Haway (2019) and Bishwoshundori (2020). He also won Best Performance in a Comic Role for Gohin Baluchor (2017).

Babu has also been featured in an Indian film.

Early life 
Babu was born on 22 August 1960 at Faridpur district in the then East Pakistan. He completed his school and college life in Faridpur. His father was a service holder, thereby he had to roam one place to another around the country. Babu was interested in acting from his childhood. In Faridpur, he joined Boishakhi Natya Gosthi pursuing to build up a career in the media arena.

Career

Acting and banking 
Babu started his acting career in 1978 when he joined the theatre group Baishakhi Natya Ghosthi in Faridpur. That same year, Babu acted for first time in a national drama festival. Meanwhile, he joined the Agrani Bank and, in 1983, transferred his banking job to Dhaka, the capital of Bangladesh, where he also joined Mamunur Rashid's Aranyak Natyadal theatre group and debuted his acting with a role in Saat Purusher Rin. Some of his performances in this theatre group include Nankar Pala, Pathar and Moyur Shinghashan.

Babu started his television acting career in the soap opera Mrittu Khuda (1991), produced by Kazi Abu Zafar Siddique, on Bangladesh Television (BTV).  However, it was his role of Poran Majhi television drama Itikatha (1991), written by Rashid, that secured him further roles in dramas such as Shundari and Danab. Babu also acted with Bengali film Daruchini Dip directed by Tauquir Ahmed while Humayun Ahmed was story, dialogue and scriptwriter.

Babu has become popular for his humorous characters but his early career in stage dramas like Danab and Jay Jayanti was in serious roles.

Babu continued to work for television and theatre simultaneously until 2000 when he stopped theatre work as television took nearly twenty-five days per month. Babu made his theatrical film début with Abdullah al Mamun's Bihanga between 2000 and 2001.

Singing
Babu emerged as a singer when he performed two songs in the film Monpura.  After that he become known to everyone as playback singer. He published his first solo music album Indubala in 2009 which was become popular in whole country. He also sang four songs on the mixed album Monchor in 2008.

Works

Film

Television

Discography

Solo
 Indubala

Duet
 Mon Chor

Film scores
 Monpura (2009)
 Ghetu Putro Komola (2012)
 Pakhal (2013)
 Meyeti Ekhon Kothay Jabe (2016)
 Sitara (2019)

References

External links
 

Living people
1960 births
21st-century Bangladeshi male actors
21st-century Bangladeshi male singers
21st-century Bangladeshi singers
Bangladeshi male film actors
Bangladeshi male stage actors
Bangladeshi male television actors
Best Supporting Actor National Film Award (Bangladesh) winners
Best Performance in a Comic Role National Film Award (Bangladesh) winners